Robarts Arena is a multi-purpose indoor arena in Sarasota, Florida, located on the Sarasota County Fairgrounds. Built in 1967, it has a seating capacity of about 4,000.  In 2011, Robarts Arena is undergoing $500,000 in capital improvements.

The arena was the home venue for the Sarasota Stingers of the Continental Basketball Association from 1983 to 1985.

External links
Official website of Sarasota County Fairgrounds, home of Robarts Arena
Robarts Arena website

Indoor arenas in Florida
Sports venues in Florida
Continental Basketball Association venues
1967 establishments in Florida
Sports venues completed in 1967

Buildings and structures in Sarasota, Florida
Sports in Sarasota, Florida